Craig Silverman is a Canadian journalist and a reporter at ProPublica. He was previously the media editor of BuzzFeed and the head of BuzzFeed's Canadian division. Known as an expert in "fake news", he founded the "Regret the Error" blog in 2004, covering fact-checking and media inaccuracy, and authored a 2009 book of the same name, which won the Arthur Rowse Award for Press Criticism from the National Press Club. 

In 2011 he joined the Poynter Institute for Media Studies as an adjunct faculty member. He also founded the hoax and rumor tracking website Emergent and co-authored a biography of Michael Calce, the hacker known as MafiaBoy. He received a 2013 Mirror Award for Best Commentary, Digital Media. 

Born in Nova Scotia, Silverman is a graduate of Concordia University in Montreal (Bachelor of Arts in journalism) and moved to Toronto to join BuzzFeed.

References

External links
Craig Silverman at BuzzFeed
Emergent

21st-century Canadian journalists
Canadian male journalists
Living people
BuzzFeed people
Year of birth missing (living people)
Writers from Nova Scotia

Concordia University alumni